Bentota is a coastal town in Sri Lanka, located in the Galle District of the Southern Province. The name of the town is derived from a mythical story which claims a demon named 'Bem' ruled the tota or river bank.

Economy
Bentota is a tourist attraction, with a local airport (Bentota River Airport) and a handful of world-class hotels. It is a destination for watersports. Bentota also delivers an ancient art of healing called Ayurveda.  Bentota is famous for its toddy production, an alcoholic beverage made out of coconut nectar. It also has a turtle hatchery, located on Induruwa beach.

History
Bentota is a historical place described in ancient messenger poems (sandeśa kāvya). The Galapatha Viharaya is one of a cluster of five ancient temples in the region. In the 17th Century the Portuguese built a small fort at the mouth of the Bentota River (Bentara Ganga), which in Sinhala was called Parangi Kotuwa, meaning the fort of the Portuguese. The river marked the southern extremity of Portuguese held territory in Sri Lanka. The Dutch subsequently allowed the fort to fall into disrepair, converting one of the large buildings within the fort into a colonial rest house for Dutch Officers travelling between Colombo and Galle. The British subsequently converted the rest house into a coastal sanatorium. Sir James Emerson Tennent (1804-1869), the colonial secretary of Ceylon (1845-1850) in his book, Ceylon, An Account of the Island (1859), stated that the rest house at Bentota, situated within a little park, deeply shaded by lofty Tamarind trees on the point of the beach where the river forms its junction with the sea, is one of the coolest and most agreeable in Ceylon. The British introduced the railway in the early 19th century, mainly to transport the coconut produce from the deep south to the capital, building a permanent bridge (Bentota Palama) to cross the river.

Transport
Access is possible from the Southern Expressway Welipenna exit and only 10 km from the exit. Helicopters fly shuttle services on charter basis.

Attractions
 Bentota Beach
Established in 1929 on the grounds of a former rubber plantation Bawa continued to develop the property until his death in 1992.
 Galapatha Raja Maha Vihare Buddhist temple, located in Bentota, contains stone inscriptions, stone carvings, pillars, ponds and troughs from the medieval period.
 Richy Skylark Helipad. This helipad operates helicopter joyrides in Bentota near the estuary operated by Skylark Aviation Helicopters.

See also
 List of towns in Southern Province, Sri Lanka
 List of beaches in Sri Lanka

References

Populated places in Southern Province, Sri Lanka
Populated places in Galle District
Seaside resorts in Sri Lanka